Alexander Ross (3 January 1895 – 12 December 1972) was a Scottish first-class cricketer and civil servant.

Ross was born at Arbroath. He represented the Civil Service cricket team as the team's wicket-keeper in its only appearance in first-class cricket against the touring New Zealanders at Chiswick in 1927. Batting twice during the match, he ended the Civil Service first-innings unbeaten without scoring, while in their second-innings was dismissed for a single run by Roger Blunt, with the fall of his wicket giving the New Zealanders victory by an innings and 15 runs. 

He died at Gosport in Southern England in December 1972.

References

External links

1895 births
1972 deaths
People from Arbroath
Scottish civil servants
Scottish cricketers
Civil Service cricketers
Sportspeople from Angus, Scotland